El Rio (Spanish: El Río, meaning "The River") is a small, rural unincorporated town in Ventura County, California, United States, on the northeast side of the 101 Freeway and Oxnard, and south of the Santa Clara River. The town was founded in 1875 and named New Jerusalem by the owner of general store who became the first postmaster in 1882. In 1885, a school and Santa Clara Catholic Church were built. Located near where the coastal railroad line crosses the Santa Clara River, the town's name was changed to El Rio around 1900. The former wagon river crossing route became the Ventura Freeway which separates the community from the commercial developments that grew up on the southwest side of the freeway. That portion of the historic community and sections closer to the river have been annexed to the city of Oxnard.  Vineyard Avenue (State Route 232) is the central business district for the largely residential community.

The population was 7,198 at the 2010 census, up from 6,193 at the time the 2000 census was enumerated. For statistical purposes, the United States Census Bureau has defined a portion of the unincorporated area as El Rio census-designated place (CDP) which does not precisely correspond to the historical community that is much larger with significant portions having been annexed to the city of Oxnard.

Etymology
El Rio was first named New Jerusalem by Simon Cohn in 1875. The post office later changed its name to El Rio in 1895, which is the Spanish translation for “the river”.

History
Early inhabitants of the area were the Chumash, a Native American tribe who continue to inhabit the area. The Chumash region extends from Point Conception to Santa Monica and back into the foothills as far as the Coast Range. One of their largest settlements was at nearby Saticoy, because of the bubbling springs that were found there.

On May 6, 1837, Juan M. Sanchez (1791–1873), a former Santa Barbara Presidio soldier, was granted the Rancho Santa Clara del Norte, which contained  of land extending from the Santa Clara River south to the northern boundary of present-day Camarillo, and from the present day 101 Freeway east to the west end of South Mountain. Sanchez and his wife, Ines Guevara de Sanchez (1794–1862), had their adobe home built below the western slope of South Mountain, within a heavy group of eucalyptus trees at the east end of present-day Rose Avenue, an avenue that was lined on both sides with tall eucalyptus trees.

The town was founded in 1875 and named New Jerusalem, California, by Simon Cohn (1852–1936), a Prussian Jewish merchant who built a general store at the location. The U.S. Post Office Department established New Jerusalem Post Office on July 26, 1882, and Cohn was appointed the first postmaster. The first one-room schoolhouse was opened in 1885. Santa Clara Catholic Church was founded the same year though services has been conducted since 1877. It was the first Catholic church to be built in Ventura County since the founding of Mission San Buenaventura 95 years earlier.

Octaviano and Rosaria Moraga were early settlers who first came to county in the 1870s from Sonora, Mexico. Octaviano worked as the barkeeper at the New Parian Hotel in Ventura, and ran a boarding house they owned in Ventura. They eventually were able to buy land in New Jerusalem where Octaviano ran a livery stable. He also drove a two-horse stage between Port Hueneme and the Montalvo train station. His descendants were part of the El Rio community up into the 21st century.

On February 14, 1895, the postal authority changed the name of the town to Jerusalem. Four months later, they changed it to Elrio (one word.) In 1905, they changed it to El Rio, two words, which means in Spanish "The River," referring to the nearby Santa Clara or to El Rio de Santa Clara o La Colonia. The town was at a crossroads on the boundary of two ranchos (El Rio de Santa Clara o La Colonia and Rancho Santa Clara del Norte).

The El Rio Post Office was discontinued on October 31, 1911. It was reestablished in 1953. Until Rio Mesa High School was built on Central Avenue northeast of El Rio and opened in 1965, El Rio students were bused to Oxnard High School and later to Camarillo High School in Camarillo. The post office was discontinued again in 1966.

Geography

East and southeast of town, within the adjoining agricultural area, is the Santa Clara Avenue Oil Field.

It has an average elevation of 80 feet.

Demographics

El Rio has the highest percentage of manufacturing workers in Ventura County: 34% of residents have jobs within the manufacturing industries.

2010
The 2010 United States Census reported that El Rio had a population of 7,198. The racial makeup of El Rio was 3,495 (48.6%) White, 58 (0.8%) African American, 201 (2.8%) Native American, 73 (1.0%) Asian, 24 (0.3%) Pacific Islander, 3,027 (42.1%) from other races, and 320 (4.4%) from two or more races. Hispanic or Latino of any race were 6,188 persons (86.0%).

The Census reported that 7,190 people (99.9% of the population) lived in households, 8 (0.1%) lived in non-institutionalized group quarters, and 0 (0%) were institutionalized.

There were 1,629 households, out of which 904 (55.5%) had children under the age of 18 living in them, 940 (57.7%) were opposite-sex married couples living together, 284 (17.4%) had a female householder with no husband present, 164 (10.1%) had a male householder with no wife present.  There were 102 (6.3%) unmarried opposite-sex partnerships, and 14 (0.9%) same-sex married couples or partnerships. 181 households (11.1%) were made up of individuals, and 79 (4.8%) had someone living alone who was 65 years of age or older. The average household size was 4.41.  There were 1,388 families (85.2% of all households); the average family size was 4.47.

The population was spread out, with 2,157 people (30.0%) under the age of 18, 930 people (12.9%) aged 18 to 24, 2,028 people (28.2%) aged 25 to 44, 1,421 people (19.7%) aged 45 to 64, and 662 people (9.2%) who were 65 years of age or older.  The median age was 29.6 years. For every 100 females, there were 106.9 males.  For every 100 females age 18 and over, there were 106.0 males.

The homeowner vacancy rate was 1.4%; the rental vacancy rate was 2.8%.  4,223 people (58.7% of the population) lived in owner-occupied housing units and 2,967 people (41.2%) lived in rental housing units.

2000
As of the census of 2000, there were 6,193 people, 1,467 households, and 1,273 families residing in the CDP. The population density was 3,961.2 people per square mile (1,532.8/km2). There were 1,491 housing units at an average density of 953.7 per square mile (369.0/km2). The racial makeup of the CDP was 47.60% White, 1.26% African American, 2.52% Native American, 1.39% Asian, 0.34% Pacific Islander, 42.48% from other races, and 4.41% from two or more races. Hispanic or Latino of any race were 77.36% of the population.

There were 1,467 households, out of which 45.9% had children under the age of 18 living with them, 63.7% were married couples living together, 15.5% had a female householder with no husband present, and 13.2% were non-families. 10.6% of all households were made up of individuals, and 6.2% had someone living alone who was 65 years of age or older. The average household size was 4.22 and the average family size was 4.31.

In the CDP, the population was spread out, with 33.0% under the age of 18, 11.2% from 18 to 24, 28.7% from 25 to 44, 16.6% from 45 to 64, and 10.5% who were 65 years of age or older. The median age was 29 years. For every 100 females, there were 105.7 males. For every 100 females age 18 and over, there were 106.7 males.

The median income for a household in the CDP was $50,273, and the median income for a family was $56,339. Males had a median income of $35,041 versus $22,254 for females. The per capita income for the CDP was $14,898. About 9.4% of families and 13.6% of the population were below the poverty line, including 19.2% of those under age 18 and 3.9% of those age 65 or over.

Arts and culture 
The Albert H. Soliz Library in the community is a branch of the Ventura County Library system. Poet and novelist Michele Serros a book-signing event here in 2006 when her young-adult novel “Honey Blonde Chica” was published. She remarked "This library was my home away from home when I was growing up." The Roger Jones Community Center is nearby with an adjoining public park.

Infrastructure 
A majority of the streets in the older unincorporated area do not have sidewalks. As traffic has increased, the safety of school children and other pedestrians has been a concern for the community. Cloverdale Mutual Water District serves 135 households in the community which is about 500 residents.
In the 1990s, the area's existing septic tanks were banned because of groundwater contamination in this area of the Oxnard Plain adjacent to the Santa Clara River. A $35 million conversion to a sewer system was undertaken by the county. The area storm water drains into the adjacent Santa Clara River.

Ventura County juvenile justice center is located on the outskirts of El Rio near the small community of Strickland and Rio Mesa High School. The high-security facility on  Vineyard Avenue is colloquially known as juvenile hall.

References

Census-designated places in California
Census-designated places in Ventura County, California
Geography of Oxnard, California
History of Ventura County, California
Populated places established in 1875
Neighborhoods in Ventura County, California